Józef Mehoffer (19 March 1869 – 8 July 1946) was a Polish painter and decorative artist, one of the leading artists of the Young Poland movement and one of the most revered Polish artists of his time.

Life

Mehoffer was born in Ropczyce, studied painting at the Academy of Fine Arts in Kraków under Władysław Łuszczkiewicz, and later at the Academy of Fine Arts in Vienna, as well as in Paris at the Académie Colarossi among others. There Mehoffer began painting portraits, often of people of historical significance. He later expanded his work to include different techniques, such as graphic art, stained glass, textiles, chalk drawings, etchings and book illustrations. He produced set designs for theatre, and stylized furniture designs.

Mehoffer received international acclaim for his stained glass windows in the Gothic St Nicholas Collegiate Church in Fribourg, Switzerland produced in 1895–1936. His other stained glass designs include the Radziwill Chapel in Balice (1892), Grauer Chapel in Opava (1901), church in Jutrosin (1902), Holy Cross Chapel at Wawel (1904), sepulchral chapel in Goluchów (1906), Orgelmeister Chapel in Vienna (1910), cathedral in Wloclawek (1935–40), cathedral in Przemysl (1940) and church in Debniki near Kraków (1943). There are stained glass designed by Mehoffer in the Church of the Sacred Heart of Jesus in Turek; in the same church there are also mural paintings made by Mehoffer.

Mehoffer explored various media further throughout his career to include a range of applied arts in his projects. He manufactured a multiplicity of book covers, ornaments and posters. Mehoffer - aside from his versatility in studio art - became known for his frescoes often reminiscent of medieval art. He frequently collaborated with Stanisław Wyspiański and Jan Matejko. He died in Wadowice.

Gallery

See also
 Culture of Kraków
 List of Poles

References

External links

Biography of Józef Mehoffer at www.artnet.com
Art Selections and Biography
About Józef Mehoffer at www.culture.pl

1869 births
1946 deaths
19th-century Polish painters
19th-century Polish male artists
20th-century Polish painters
20th-century Polish male artists
Polish people of German descent
Burials at Rakowicki Cemetery
Golden Laurel of the Polish Academy of Literature
Academy of Fine Arts Vienna alumni
Académie Colarossi alumni
Polish male painters
Commanders of the Order of Polonia Restituta
École des Beaux-Arts alumni
Academic staff of the Jan Matejko Academy of Fine Arts
Polish printmakers
People from Ropczyce-Sędziszów County